Kuchugury is a rural locality (a selo) in Kuchugurovskoye Rural Settlement, Nizhnedevitsky District, Voronezh Oblast, Russia. The population was 475 as of 2010. There are 4 streets.

Geography 
Kuchugury is located 10 km north of Nizhnedevitsk (the district's administrative centre) by road. Log is the nearest rural locality.

References 

Rural localities in Nizhnedevitsky District